Adya Hount'tò is a loa associated with drumming in West African Vodun.

References
 

Voodoo gods
Arts gods

Voodoo deities